Evan James Marshall (born 29 January 1970 in Invercargill, New Zealand) was a New Zealand cricketer who played for the Otago Volts in the Plunket Shield.

See also
 List of Otago representative cricketers

References

External links

1970 births
Living people
New Zealand cricketers
Otago cricketers
Cricketers from Invercargill
South Island cricketers